Caesars Challenge is an American game show that aired on NBC from June 14, 1993 to January 14, 1994 and emanated from the Circus Maximus Theatre inside Caesars Palace in Las Vegas, Nevada. Ahmad Rashad hosted the series and, in keeping with the theme of the show's location, he was assisted by a man dressed as a Roman gladiator. Dan Doherty played the role for most of the show's run, with Chad Brown and Zach Ruby handling the earliest episodes before Doherty joined the show.

The show was a co-production of Rosner Television and Stephen J. Cannell Productions, and was the only game show that was produced by the latter company.

Gameplay
Three contestants competed in three rounds, attempting to solve scrambled words up to nine letters in length that were displayed on an onstage slot machine. 

Rashad asked a series of multiple-choice trivia questions, for which any contestant could buzz in and answer. A correct response awarded money, allowed the contestant to place one letter in its correct position, and gave him/her five seconds to guess the word. If a contestant missed a question, either opponent could buzz in and try to steal; a second miss gave the money, letter, and guess to the last contestant by default. Solving the word awarded additional money for each letter that had not yet been placed. 

Each word and series of questions fit a specific category, which was initially revealed to the contestants before play began. Later, the category was shown only to the home audience, and Rashad did not disclose it to the contestants until after the word had been solved.

Questions and unplaced letters were worth $100 each in the first round, $200 in the second, and $300 in the third. One position in each word was designated as a "Lucky Slot"; if a contestant placed a letter there and immediately solved the word, he/she won a bonus in addition to the money for the unplaced letters. The bonus (referred to as the "Instant Jackpot") started at $500 each day, increased by this amount for every word in which it went unclaimed, and reset to $500 after it was won.

Two words were played in each of the first two rounds, while the third round continued until time was called. If a word was in progress at the end of the third round, the Lucky Slot was removed from play and the remaining letters were put in place one at a time until someone buzzed-in and guessed the word, scoring $300 per unplaced letter. An incorrect guess locked the contestant out of the word. If time was called after a word was completed, one final word was played under these same rules.

The high scorer became the day's champion and advanced to the bonus round. Originally, the champion bought prizes with his/her accumulated money; later, he/she received a prize package of equivalent value to the cash total. The other two contestants received parting gifts, including dinner at Caesars and tickets for one of its headlining acts at the time. In the event of a tie, one last speed-up word was played between the tied contestants to determine the winner.

Bonus round
In the bonus round, the champion was given an opportunity to win a new car. Two different formats were used.

First format
A giant rotating cage similar to a bingo calling machine was lowered from the ceiling. Inside were 200 plastic balls, each marked with a letter of the alphabet; one ball at a time was dispensed into a chute, and Rashad's assistant called out its letter. A backstage computer kept track of the letters and searched for any valid nine-letter words that could be formed from them. Once such a word was found, a gong sounded. The drawing ended at this point, and the letters in the word were displayed to the champion in the order that they were drawn. He/she was allowed to place one letter in its correct position for every main-game victory up to that point, then had 10 seconds to guess the word; successfully doing so won the car.

Champions remained on the show until they either won the car or were defeated in the main game, whichever came first. 

When Caesars Challenge first premiered, letters were only drawn once the bonus round had started. Partway through the run, the drawing began during the commercial break before this round as a time-saving measure. The champion and home audience were shown the letters that were drawn during the break.

Second format
The second bonus format was introduced on November 22, 1993, and continued for the remainder of the run.

The champion was shown five scrambled words, each a different length from five to nine letters, on a screen placed in front of the slot machine. He/she had 30 seconds to solve the words, starting with the shortest and working upward by length. The current word was unscrambled, one letter at a time, until the champion solved it. No passing was allowed; the champion had to solve each word before moving to the next. He/she won the car for unscrambling all five words.

Under this format, champions remained on the show until they either won the car, lost the main game, or played the bonus round three times.

Audience game
During the closing credits of every show, Rashad and his assistant moved through the audience, carrying a bowl filled with silver dollars, Caesars Palace casino chips, and chocolate medallions wrapped in gold foil. They chose one audience member at a time to unscramble a five-letter word; each person who did so was allowed to take one handful from the bowl.

Pilot episode 
The pilot episode had significant gameplay differences compared to the show as aired; notably, the contestants bet on if they could guess the word or not (utilizing a keypad embedded into their podiums). The players were given $2,500 at the start of the game; while the questions were still worth $100, $200 or $300 depending on the round, the max bet per word would be $250 with a 2:1 payoff for the first three words; the max bet increased to $500 afterwards, while the payoff odds increased to 3:1 by the fifth word. Additionally, the Instant Jackpot gained by the Lucky Slot would carry over from day to day instead of resetting every day.

Broadcast history
During development, the show was known as Illusions and was intended for first-run syndication (and continued to be offered by Cannell Distribution into 1993, though only one station, KCAL-TV in Los Angeles, picked the show up); the pilot episode was taped in October of 1992.

Caesars Challenge replaced Scattergories on NBC's daytime schedule when it premiered on June 14, 1993 and inherited its timeslot of 12:30 pm Eastern. Some affiliates did not air Caesars Challenge at its scheduled time due to the affiliates' longstanding practice of preempting programs that the networks aired in the noon hour in favor of news or syndicated programming; this resulted in some stations airing Caesars Challenge in another spot on their schedule while others did not air it at all. In the markets that did air the show at its normal time, Caesars Challenge faced off against CBS' The Young and the Restless, and did not perform well enough against either that series or ABC's Loving, its other competition. NBC cancelled Caesars Challenge after 31 weeks of episodes, and returned the 12:00 pm hour to its affiliates on January 17, 1994. However, NBC took back the noon hour from its affiliates when Sunset Beach premiered in January 1997. Caesars Challenge was NBC's last daytime game show, and the last new daytime game show format on any of the Big Three television networks to date (only one new game show, a revival of Let's Make a Deal on CBS in 2009, has debuted in network daytime since Caesars Challenge was cancelled).

Reruns aired on the USA Network from June 27 to November 4, 1994.

International versions
 Israel–Kasino Olami ("Global Casino") was hosted by Michal Zoharetz and was broadcast by Reshet

References

External links
 
 Official site for Caesars Challenge

NBC original programming
1990s American game shows
1993 American television series debuts
1994 American television series endings
Television series by Stephen J. Cannell Productions
English-language television shows
Caesars Palace